The 1985 Cotton Bowl Classic was the 49th edition of the college football bowl game, played at the Cotton Bowl in Dallas, Texas, on Tuesday, January 1. Part of the 1984–85 bowl game season, it matched the No. 8 Boston College Eagles (independent) and the unranked Houston Cougars of the  Boston College never trailed and won 45–28.

Teams

Boston College

Boston College quarterback Doug Flutie gained national attention on November 23, when he led the Eagles to a memorable  win at Miami, in what would be called Hail Flutie. He left school as the NCAA’s all-time passing yardage leader with  a consensus All-American, and the first quarterback to win the Heisman Trophy in  This was BC's first Cotton Bowl appearance in 45 years, since January 1940. Boston College finished the regular season with a 9–2 record, and was the recipient of the Lambert-Meadowlands Trophy (emblematic of the 'Eastern championship' in Division I FBS).

Houston

Houston shared the Southwest Conference title for the first time since 1979. By virtue of their defeat of conference co-champion SMU during the season, the Cougars made their first Cotton Bowl appearance in five years. SMU defeated Notre Dame in the Aloha Bowl on December 28; the Mustangs finished with ten wins and were eighth in the final AP poll. Houston was the first unranked team to represent the SWC in the Cotton Bowl in seventeen years.

Game summary
The game kicked off shortly after 12:30 p.m. CST, as did the Fiesta Bowl on NBC.

The Eagles rolled to a 31–14 lead at halftime on Flutie's three touchdown passes (to three different receivers) and a Steve Strachan 2-yard touchdown run, despite the Cougars' two quick ways of scoring touchdowns, one of which occurring when Larry Shepherd caught a Gerald Landry pass for a touchdown with 22 seconds left in the half.

Raymond Tate narrowed the lead with his touchdown late in the third quarter. Audray McMillian intercepted a Flutie pass and returned it 25 yards to the end zone to make it 31–28 as the third quarter ended. But the Eagles scored with 5:45 remaining on a Strachan 4-yard touchdown run. Troy Stradford sealed the game with a 18-yard touchdown run with 1:06 to go in the fourth quarter as Boston College won their first Cotton Bowl.

Scoring
First quarter
Boston College – Kelvin Martin 63-yard pass from Doug Flutie (Kevin Snow kick)
Boston College – Troy Stradford 8-yard pass from Flutie (Snow kick)
Houston – Earl Allen 98-yard kickoff return (Mike Clendenen kick)
Boston College – Snow 31-yard field goal
Second quarter
Boston College – Gerard Phelan 13-yard pass from Flutie (Snow kick)
Boston College – Steve Strachan 2-yard run (Snow kick)
Houston – Larry Shepherd 15-yard pass from Gerald Landry (Clendenen kick)
Third quarter
Houston – Raymond Tate 2-yard run (Clendenen kick)
Houston – Audray McMillan 25-yard interception return (Clendenen kick)
Fourth quarter
Boston College – Strachan 4-yard run (Snow kick)
Boston College – Stradford 18-yard run (Snow kick)

Statistics
{| class=wikitable style="text-align:center"
! Statistics !! BostonCollege   !! Houston
|-
|align=left|First downs	||22	||15
|-
|align=left|Rushes–yards||50–357||42–202
|-
|align=left|Passing yards||180	||154
|-
|align=left|Passes	||13–37–2||9–29–2
|-
|align=left|Total yards	||537	||356
|-
|align=left|Punts–average||8–29||10–33
|-
|align=left|Fumbles–lost ||2–1	||3–2
|-
|align=left|Turnovers||3||4
|-
|align=left|Penalties–yards||7–64||7–66
|-
|align=left|Time of possession||34:41||25:19
|}

Aftermath
Boston College improved to 10–2 and climbed to No. 5 in the final AP poll. Through , neither team has returned to the Cotton Bowl Classic.

References

Cotton Bowl
Cotton Bowl Classic
Houston Cougars football bowl games
Boston College Eagles football bowl games
Cotton Bowl Classic
Cotton Bowl Classic